The 2006 European Cup Winter Throwing was held on 18 and 19 March at Hadar Yosef Stadium in Tel Aviv, Israel. It was the sixth edition of the athletics competition for throwing events organised by the European Athletics Association. A total of 168 athletes from 28 countries entered the competition.

The competition featured men's and women's contests in shot put, discus throw, javelin throw and hammer throw. Athletes were seeded into "A" and "B" groups in each competition.

Polish and Russian athletes dominated the proceedings. Poland won five of the eight contests while Russia provided the silver medallist in six events. Russia was the winner in the men's and women's team points competition.

Andrei Mikhnevich of Belarus was the original winner of the shot put (and a frequent world medallist during the period). In 2013 all his results from August 2005 onwards were annulled after a retest of his doping sample from the 2005 World Championships in Athletics proved to be positive, resulting in a lifetime ban for the athlete. Romania's Gheorghe Guşet was promoted to first place in the European Cup field.

Medal summary

Medal and points table
Key

 Belarus's score in the men's team competition was originally 5373 points. Following Andrei Mikhnevich's disqualification in 2013, his points total of 1157 was replaced by that of his countryman Yury Bialou who was ninth with 1065 points.

References

Results
6th European Cup Winter Throwing Results. RFEA. Retrieved on 2013-11-16.
ECp-WT  Tel Aviv  ISR  18 - 19 March European Cup Winter Throwing. Tilastopaja. Retrieved on 2013-11-16.

External links
Official website (archived)

European Throwing Cup
European Cup Winter Throwing
Athletics competitions in Israel
2006 in European sport
European Cup Winter Throwing
Throwing, 2006 European Cup Winter
2000s in Tel Aviv